In Euclidean geometry, the Neuberg cubic is a special cubic plane curve associated with a reference triangle with several remarkable properties. It is named after Joseph Jean Baptiste Neuberg (30 October 1840 – 22 March 1926), a Luxembourger mathematician, who first introduced the curve in a paper published in 1884. The curve appears as the first item, with identification number K001, in Bernard Gilbert's Catalogue of Triangle Cubics which is a compilation of extensive information about more than 1200 triangle cubics.

Definitions

The Neuberg cubic can be defined as a locus in many different ways. However, it needs to be proved that the locus so defined is indeed a cubic curve. A second way is to define it as the locus of point  such that if  are the circumcenters of triangles , then the lines  are concurrent. Yet another way is to define it as the locus of  satisfying the following property known as the quadrangles involutifs (this was the way in which Neuberg introduced the curve):

Equation
Let  be the side lengths of the reference triangle .

Other terminology: 21-point curve, 37-point curve

In the older literature the Neuberg curve commonly referred to as the 21-point curve. The terminology refers to the property of the curve discovered by Neuberg himself that it passes through certain special 21 points associated with the reference triangle.
The vertices 
The reflections  of the vertices  in the opposite sidelines
The orthocentre 
The circumcenter 
The six vertices  of the equilateral triangles constructed on the sides of triangle 
The two isogonic centers (the points X(13) and X(14) in the Encyclopedia of Triangle Centers)
The two isodynamic points (the points X(15) and X(16) in the Encyclopedia of Triangle Centers)
The attached figure shows the Neuberg cubic of triangle  with all the above mentioned 21 special points on it.

In a paper published in 1925, B. H. Brown reported his discovery of 16 additional special points on the Neuberg cubic making the total number of then known special points on the cubic 37. Because of this, the Neuberg cubic is also sometimes referred to as the 37-point cubic. Currently, a huge number of special points are known to lie on the Neuberg cubic. Gilbert's Catalogue has a special page dedicated to a listing of such special points which are also triangle centers.

Some properties of the Neuberg cubic

Neuberg cubic as a circular cubic
The equation in trilinear coordinates of the line at infinity in the plane of the reference triangle is

There are two special points on this line called the circular points at infinity. Every circle in the plane of the triangle passes through these two points and every conic which passes through these points is a circle. The trilinear coordinates of these points are

where . Any cubic curve which passes through the two circular points at infinity is called a circular cubic. The Neuberg cubic is a circular cubic.

Neuberg cubic as a  pivotal isogonal cubic
The isogonal conjugate of a point  with respect to a triangle  is the point of concurrence of the reflections of the lines  about the angle bisectors of  respectively. A self-isogonal cubic is a triangle cubic that is invariant under isogonal conjugation. A pivotal isogonal cubic is a cubic in which points  lying on the cubic and their isogonal conjugates are collinear with a fixed point  known as the pivot point of the cubic. The Neuberg cubic is a pivotal isogonal cubic having its pivot at the intersection of the Euler line with the line at infinity. In Kimberling's Encyclopedia of Triangle Centers, this point is denoted by X(30).

Neuberg cubic as a  pivotol orthocubic
Let  be a point in the plane of triangle . Let the trilinear pole of  be . An isopivotal cubic is a triangle cubic having the property that there is a fixed point  such that, for any point M on the cubic, the points  are collinear. The fixed point  is called the orthopivot of the cubic. The Neuberg cubic is an orthopivotal cubic with orthopivot at the triangle's circumcenter.

Additional reading

Abdikadir Altintas, On Some Properties Of Neuberg Cubic

References

Triangle geometry